Raoul Bernard Lucien Marie (17 June 1918 – 10 February 2015) was a French former international rugby referee, former Deputy in the French National Assembly (1967–1981), and former Mayor of Biarritz (1977–1991). He is also the founder of the organization Fondation du Bénévolat and a grand officer of the Legion of Honour. His daughter is former cabinet minister Michèle Alliot-Marie (born 1946), who served as Defense Minister, Interior Minister, Justice Minister, and Foreign Affairs Minister.

References

External links
 Fondation du Bénévolat 

1918 births
2015 deaths
Politicians from Toulouse
Union of Democrats for the Republic politicians
Rally for the Republic politicians
Deputies of the 3rd National Assembly of the French Fifth Republic
Deputies of the 4th National Assembly of the French Fifth Republic
Deputies of the 5th National Assembly of the French Fifth Republic
Deputies of the 6th National Assembly of the French Fifth Republic
Mayors of places in Nouvelle-Aquitaine
French rugby union referees
French military personnel of World War II
French Resistance members
Grand Officiers of the Légion d'honneur
Sportspeople from Haute-Garonne